Richard Wittschiebe Hand (rwhdesign, RWH, formerly Richard + Wittschiebe, Hand Design Studio) is an architecture firm based in Atlanta, Georgia with an office in Madison, Wisconsin. Richard Wittschiebe Hand specializes in
architecture, interior design, planning, and green/LEED consulting. RWH focuses primarily on K-12 schools, colleges and universities, corporate and industrial office spaces, aquatic facilities, recreational and parks buildings, and fraternity houses. Richard Wittschiebe Hand was awarded the 2011 AIA Georgia "Firm Of The Year" award.

History
Richard Wittschiebe Hand was formed in 2007 when Richard + Wittschiebe merged with Hand Design Studio (formerly Peter H. Hand and Associates, Inc.) to become Richard Wittschiebe Hand. Richard + Wittschiebe was formed by Janice Wittschiebe, AIA and Carol Richard, AIA.

Partners
Carol Richard, AIA, LEED AP Homes has been providing professional services since 1980 as a project designer and project manager for numerous project types and sizes.  As founder of the firm, she brings a diversity of experience to the practice.  In addition to her architectural experience, she has led the firm in technological advances to better serve clients.  She is instrumental in providing team leadership and direction.

Janice Wittschiebe, AIA, NCIDQ, LEED AP has been providing professional services since 1980 as a project designer, project manager and principal for large multi-faceted projects.  As a registered architect and a registered interior designer, she brings a wide range of abilities and understanding to the RWH. Key to her experience has been the management of design teams, coordination of multiple consultants, contract administration and work on ADA-oriented projects as well as corporate responsibilities for marketing.

Peter Hand, AIA, LEED AP
has provided professional architecture services in the southeast since 1973. As Principal of Hand Design Studio, he coordinated master planning, architecture, construction management, and interior design services for a wide range of project types.  As Consulting Principal of Richard Wittschiebe Hand, Peter is responsible for working with the architectural team in the creation and development of project design.  He is responsible for working closely with the team to ensure the design has integrity, simplicity and innovation and that it meets the owner's goals and needs.

William (Bill) Polk, AIA, LEED AP, CSI has provided professional expertise in all phases of planning, design, production and contract administration for a variety of project types, including medical facilities, education, single and multi-family housing, and institutional including kitchen and assembly design and military facilities since 1984.  He is especially talented at project management, working well with owners, user groups and consultants to gain the most from prescribed budgets through creative consideration of options.

Technology and Sustainable Design
RWH utilizes ArchiCAD BIM 3D modeling software on 8-core Apple MacPro workstations for architectural projects, and was one of the first firms in Atlanta to implement a BIM design system in 1989, and the first in Atlanta to use ArchiCAD. RWH is also one of the few architecture firms in Atlanta to use Apple Macintosh workstations. Each workstation has access to the BIM server where realtime collaborative design and document production occurs. In addition, Ross Street House, the first LEED-Platinum home in the state of Wisconsin, was designed by RWH using entirely ArchiCAD. Over 90% of the staff are LEED Accredited Professionals (LEED AP).

Notable Projects

American Society of Heating, Refrigerating and Air-Conditioning Engineers (ASHRAE), Atlanta, Georgia.
In 2006, the ASHRAE headquarters building in Atlanta, Georgia underwent planning and development for the renewal of their  office building. ASHRAE hired Richard Wittschiebe Hand as the architecture firm. The finished building achieved a LEED-Platinum rating by the USGBC. The building renovation/addition includes a new training center, meeting and education spaces, a technical library, offices, a loading area and bulk storage.

One of the most innovative components in the building's design is an extensive measurement and verification system that monitors and measures electricity, energy consumption, water use, and local weather conditions in real-time. This monitoring was essential to ASHRAE's "walk the walk" theme by proving the tangible and financial benefits of green design. The data is available to national and international members through internet-based programs.

Notes

External links
Official website

Design companies established in 1973
Architecture firms based in Georgia (U.S. state)
Companies based in Atlanta
Interior design
1973 establishments in Georgia (U.S. state)